Alfredo Pereira do Nascimento (born May 5, 1952) is Brazil's former minister of Transport. He is a member of the Republic Party, and was the party's president until he resigned in 2016 in support of the Impeachment process against Dilma Rousseff. He has occasionally been at odds with environmental minister Carlos Minc over projects in Amazonas and Rondônia. Nascimento was mayor of Manaus in the year 1988 and between 1997 until 2004, when he resigned to take over the Ministry of Transport of Brazil

References 

Government ministers of Brazil
1952 births
Living people
Liberal Party (Brazil, 2006) politicians
Liberal Party (Brazil, 1985) politicians
Progressistas politicians
Reform Progressive Party politicians
Democratic Social Party politicians
Liberal Front Party (Brazil) politicians
Democratic Labour Party (Brazil) politicians
Brazilian Democratic Movement politicians
Mayors of Manaus
Members of the Chamber of Deputies (Brazil) from Amazonas